Bader Philanthropies Inc. is a Milwaukee, Wisconsin based foundation that consists of funds from the Helen Daniels Bader Fund and the Isabel and Alfred Bader Fund. It pledges to give away $14 million annually. The organization centers on the health of older adults and improving lives of low-income Milwaukeeans and Jewish education in Milwaukee.

History

The Helen Daniels Bader Fund has a history of focusing on Alzheimer's and the health of older adults, while the Isabel and Alfred Bader Fund focuses on "improving the lives of low-income Milwaukeeans and Jewish education throughout the city."

The creation of the Helen Bader Foundation Inc was first announced in November 1991.

In January 2015 it was announced that the Foundation would be restructuring. Additional charitable funding by Alfred Bader and his second wife Isabel, initially in the amount of $10 million, resulted in the formation of Bader Philanthropies Inc. The organization continued Helen's legacy under what became the Helen Daniels Bader Fund, while adding the new Isabel and Alfred Bader Fund to support charitable work in line with their interests. Under both funds, monies are allocated either as grants or as program-related investments. During the period 1992–2021, some $400 million was awarded, benefiting a range of areas, including Alzheimer’s & aging, arts, employment, youth, and Jewish education.

Governance
 Daniel Bader, president and chief executive officer, second son of Alfred Bader and Helen Bader
 David Bader, vice president and executive board member, elder son of Alfred Bader and Helen Bader

Grantees
These are among grants recently awarded:
 2022, grant to the Electa Quinney Institute for American Indian Education at the University of Wisconsin-Milwaukee, in the amount of $3 million, to be distributed over a five-year period.
 2022,
 2022,

See also
 Argosy Foundation
 Zilber Family Foundation

References

Medical and health foundations in the United States
Organizations based in Milwaukee
2015 establishments in Wisconsin
Organizations established in 2015